Aljabowbi Castle is a castle in the Hadda neighborhood of the southern outskirts of Sana'a, Yemen, southwest of the Lebanon Heart Hospital and west of the Lebanese International University and south of the Japanese Embassy and the Hadda Mineral Water Factory.

References

Buildings and structures in Sanaa
Castles in Yemen